ISKCON Prabartak Sri Krishna Temple is a temple located in Chittagong, the largest in Bangladesh. The architectural style and aesthetics of this temple enhance the beauty very much. The temple is almost many years old and is run by the International Society for Krishna Consciousness (ISKCON). It is one of the most funded temples in Bangladesh.

History 
ISKCON established a Krishna temple.

Architectural style 

The entire temple is built of Makrana marble in Rajasthan. Door-window wood has been procured from Africa and Myanmar. The temple is 100 feet long, 50 feet wide and 75 feet high. This temple with 9 domes is established in 18 places. The pillars of these stairs are decorated with conch chakra gada padma. The handsome chakra of Vishnu is adorned in the top three domes of the temple. At the entrance of the temple is a replica of Arjuna's vision of the cosmos of Lord Krishna, and a statue of Joy-Vijaya, the gatekeeper of Vaikuntha, is placed. Inside each wall there are eye-catching designs, sitting chandeliers. Doors and windows made of wood brought from Myanmar are decorated with artistic crafts. According to the temple management board, the ground floor of the Krishna temple will be used as an auditorium. Then Natmandir on the 1st floor, Vigraha Mandir on the 2nd and 3rd floor. The main idol is Sri Sri Radha-Kunjbihari (Radha-Krishna), on both sides are Lalita-Vishakha, on the other hand Sri Sri Jagannath-Baldev-Subhadra Maharani and on the right side Sri Sri Gaur Nitai will be worshiped in the devotional offerings of the devotees. The enjoyment room (Prasad kitchen) adjacent to the idol room will be out of sight of the visitors. The temple authorities said that the bhogghar is being kept out of sight for the purpose of performing the devotional activities in front of the deity after cooking. And on one side of the roof is the living room of the priests. The seat of the idol made of wood brought from Africa is decorated in the temple. The idol of Acharya Srila Abhayacharanarbinda Bhaktivedanta Swami Prabhupada, the founder of ISKCON, is being placed on the Ratna throne facing the idol in the womb of the temple. Independent Gouranga Das Brahmachari, who is in charge of the temple, told banglanews that Pravartak Sangha Smritismaran Shiva Mandir and Sriram Bhakta Mahabir Hanumanji Mandir are being set up next to this temple. Religious painting is being highlighted in the work of fiber. Murals of Sriram Leela, Nru-Singh Leela, Gaurlila, Jagannath Leela, Lord Vishnu's vehicle Garuda Dev, Mahaprabhu's councilor Sri Krishna Chaitanya, Lord Nityananda, Sri Advaita, Gadadhar, Srivastava have been carved on the door. There is also the image of the first incarnation of Vishnu, the dwarf deity, touching the head of the demon king Bali.

The work of building the temple 
Since 2010, 30 Indian and 50 Bangladeshi workers have worked together for 10 years to build the entire structure of the temple. Karmayajna started from 2010. The temple was scheduled to be inaugurated in March 2020. But it was postponed due to the COVID-19 pandemic.

References

Radha Krishna temples
21st-century Hindu temples
Hindu temples in Chittagong District